Earl De La Warr is a title in the Peerage of Great Britain. It was created in 1761 for John West, 7th Baron De La Warr.

The Earl holds the subsidiary titles of Viscount Cantelupe (1761) in the Peerage of Great Britain, Baron De La Warr (1572) in the Peerage of England, and Baron Buckhurst, of Buckhurst in the County of Sussex (1864) in the Peerage of the United Kingdom. The barony De La Warr is of the second creation; however, it bears the precedence of the first creation, 1299, and has done so since shortly after the death of William West, 1st Baron De La Warr.

The family seat is Buckhurst Park, near Withyham, Sussex.

Etymology
The name de La Warr is from Sussex and of Anglo-French origin. It may have come from La Guerre, a Norman lieu-dit. This toponymic could derive from the Latin word ager, from the Breton gwern or from the Late Latin  (fallow). The toponyms Gara, Gaire also appear in old texts cited by Lucien Musset, where the word ga(i)ra means gore. It could also be linked with a patronymic from the Old Norse verr.

The barony and earldom are both pronounced "De La Ware", as in the American state of Delaware.

Baronies of De La Warr
The barony De La Warr is of the second creation; however, it bears the precedence of the first creation, 1299, and has done so since shortly after the death of William West, 1st Baron De La Warr. The precise legal situation concerning the second creation is murky. The modern rules attempt to regularize medieval practice, but there are many cases that cannot easily be made to fit, whether because a local custom was involved, or because an exception was made, or because the rules were still in flux. This is such a case because William West was heir male but not heir general. Because the original barony was created by writ, the descent is presumed to be to the heir (or heirs) general, and therefore it fell into abeyance between the daughters of Sir Owen West (and their heirs in turn). The second creation has been viewed in at least three ways:
 As a means of placing beyond dispute an inheritance that should have gone to the heir male in the first place. The act concerning precedence is understood as rectifying the side effect this had of altering the precedence. Accordingly, some writers ignore the second creation when numbering: thus Thomas West, 3rd Baron De La Warr, is sometimes called the 12th Baron De La Warr.
 As an extraordinary act resolving an important estate that should not be left in abeyance. In this case, the previous barony was intended to be extinguished and the act altering precedence is difficult to understand other than as political expediency.
 As a part of an effort to solve relatively complex problems of inheritance case by case, before the doctrine of abeyance (as it now exists) had been worked out.

Connection to American geographical names

In United States history books, Thomas West, 3rd Baron De La Warr is often named simply as "Lord Delaware". He served as governor of the Jamestown Colony in Virginia, and Delaware Bay was named after him. The state of Delaware, the Delaware River, and the Delaware Indian tribe were so-called after the bay, and thus ultimately derive their names from the barony. Many other American counties, townships, and the like derive their names directly or indirectly from this connection.

Other family members
Notable 20th-century descendants of George Sackville-West, 5th Earl De La Warr include the authors Lady Margaret Sackville, Vita Sackville-West, Nigel Nicolson and Adam Nicolson.

Another member of the West family was William Cornwallis-West (1835–1917), who was the grandson of the Hon. Frederick West, youngest son of the second Earl. Cornwallis-West was the father of George Cornwallis-West; Daisy, Princess of Pless; and Constance, Duchess of Westminster.

Barons De La Warr; First creation (1299)
 Roger la Warr, 1st Baron De La Warr (fl. 1320)
 John la Warr, 2nd Baron De La Warr (c. 1277–1347)
 Roger la Warr, 3rd Baron De La Warr (c. 1329–1370)
 John la Warr, 4th Baron De La Warr (c. 1344–1398)
 Thomas la Warr, 5th Baron De La Warr (c. 1352–1427)
 Reginald West, 6th Baron De La Warr (c. 1394–1451)
 Richard West, 7th Baron De La Warr (c. 1430–1476)
 Thomas West, 8th Baron De La Warr (c. 1457–1525)
 Thomas West, 9th Baron De La Warr (c. 1475–1554) (either abeyant or extinguished or merged 1554)

Barons De La Warr; Second creation (1572)
 William West, 1st Baron De La Warr (1520–1595) (or 10th Baron)
 Thomas West, 2nd Baron De La Warr (1556–1602) (or 11th Baron)
 Thomas West, 3rd Baron De La Warr (1577–1618) (or 12th Baron)
 Henry West, 4th Baron De La Warr (1603–1628) (or 13th Baron)
 Charles West, 5th Baron De La Warr (1626–1687) (or 14th Baron)
 John West, 6th Baron De La Warr (1663–1723) (or 15th Baron)
 John West, 7th Baron De La Warr (1693–1766) (or 16th Baron), who was created Earl De La Warr and Viscount Cantelupe in 1761.

Earls De La Warr (1761)
 John West, 1st Earl De La Warr (1693–1766) (7th Baron)
 John West, 2nd Earl De La Warr (1729–1777)
 William Augustus West, 3rd Earl De La Warr (1757–1783)
 John Richard West, 4th Earl De La Warr (1758–1795)
 George John Sackville-West, 5th Earl De La Warr (1791–1869)
 Charles Richard Sackville West, 6th Earl De La Warr (1815–1873)
 Reginald Windsor Sackville, 7th Earl De La Warr (1817–1896)
 Gilbert George Reginald Sackville, 8th Earl De La Warr (1869–1915)
 Herbrand Edward Dundonald Brassey Sackville, 9th Earl De La Warr (1900–1976)
 William Herbrand Sackville, 10th Earl De La Warr (1921–1988)
 William Herbrand Sackville, 11th Earl De La Warr (b. 1948)

The heir apparent is the present holder's son William Herbrand Thomas Sackville, Lord Buckhurst (b. 1979), nine generations away from the first Earl.

The heir apparent's heir apparent is his son William Lionel Robert Sackville (b. 2014).

See also
 George John Frederick West, Viscount Cantelupe (1814–1850), eldest son of the 5th Earl De La Warr
 Lionel Charles Cranfield Sackville, Viscount Cantelupe (1868–1890), eldest son of the 7th Earl De La Warr
 William Herbrand Thomas Sackville, Lord Buckhurst (b. 1979), eldest son and heir apparent to the 11th Earl De La Warr

References

External links

 
Earldoms in the Peerage of Great Britain
 
Earl
Noble titles created in 1761
People from Withyham